Heinz Steinmann (born 1 February 1938) is a German former footballer who played as a defender. He spent eight seasons in the Bundesliga with 1. FC Saarbrücken and Werder Bremen, winning the Bundesliga in the 1964–65 season with Werder Bremen. He also represented Germany three times, all in friendlies. He scored an equaliser in a 2–2 draw against France in 1962.

Honours
Schwarz-Weiß Essen
 DFB-Pokal: 1958–59

Werder Bremen
 Bundesliga: 1964–65; runner-up 1967–68

References

External links
 
 

Living people
1938 births
Footballers from Essen
German footballers
Association football defenders
Germany international footballers
Bundesliga players
Schwarz-Weiß Essen players
1. FC Saarbrücken players
SV Werder Bremen players